Aris is a surname. Notable people with the name include:
Alexander Aris (born 1973), civil rights activist of British and Burmese descent
Ben Aris (1937–2003), English actor
Ernest Aris (1882–1963) (also known as Robin A Hood and Dan Crow), Author and illustrator of children's books
Helmut Aris (1908–87), Jewish politician in the GDR
John Aris (1843–1927), English-born New Zealand cricketer
Jonathan Aris (born 1971), British actor
Michael Aris (1946–99), British historian specialising in Bhutanese, Tibetan and Himalayan culture and history
Rutherford Aris (1929–2005), Chemical engineer